Widdifield Secondary School (WSS) was a high school located on Ski Club Road in North Bay, Ontario. It was a member of the Near North District School Board.

Overview 
Widdifield's motto was "Mens Quaerens in Corpore Sano," loosely meaning "an inquiring mind in a sound body." Alumni are known as the Widdifield Wildcats, and the school colours were red and royal blue.

The school was founded in 1965.  Because of the extensive area of the school zone, 35% of the approximately 900 students were bussed.

Widdifield was also the first school in Canada to incorporate the option of receiving the Specialist High Skills Major (SHSM)- Arts and Culture certificate upon graduation.

The school was named after Joseph Henry Widdifield, who was born in 1845, was a physician and a Liberal member of Legislative Assembly of Ontario representing York North.

In September 2017, the Near North District School Board voted to close the school. In January 2018, it was announced the school would close in June 2019. 

In September 2018, it was announced that the closure would be delayed by at least one year due to the lack of funding to update the other two high schools.

Widdifield Secondary School closed in June 2020.

Drama
Widdifield's The Company
 International Thespian Society Festival, numerous Widdifield productions have traveled to the annual drama festival, which was held at the University of Nebraska-Lincoln. 
 Sears Ontario Drama Festival, Widdifield has been a part of the drama Festival for almost 50 years and have won over 100 awards in the District, Regional and Provincial rounds. 
Widdifield is also the home of the local theatre program, Theatre Out Reach On Stage, in the summer time.

Notable alumni
Al McDonald, mayor of North Bay
 Michael O'Shea, former linebacker for the Toronto Argonauts of the CFL
 Mike Yeo, former coach of the Minnesota Wild of the National Hockey League

See also
List of high schools in Ontario

References

External links
 Widdifield Secondary School
 School profile page

Educational institutions established in 1965
High schools in North Bay, Ontario
1965 establishments in Ontario